The Vickers–Berthier (VB) is a light machine gun that was produced by the British company Vickers-Armstrong. It was adopted by the British Indian Army and saw combat during World War II.

History

Berthier machine gun 
The Vickers–Berthier was based on a French design of just before World War I. It was proposed for use with infantry as Fusil Mitrailleur Berthier Modèle 1910, Modèle 1911, Modèle 1912, Modèle 1916 and Modèle 1920. It was also proposed in 1918 to US Army which finally refused it. A later version, the Fusil Mitrailleur Berthier Modèle 1922, competed for the replacement of the Chauchat LMG in the French army but the Fusil Mitrailleur MAC modèle 1924 was adopted.

Vickers-Berthier machine gun 
In 1925 Vickers in Britain purchased licence rights of the Berthier Model 1922 for production in their Crayford factory, and as a replacement for the Lewis Gun. It was an alternative to the water-cooled Vickers machine gun made by the same company. The weapon used a gas and tipping bolt mechanism similar to the Bren gun, was air-cooled like the Bren and also like the Bren had a removable barrel. It was adopted by the Indian Army in 1933.
During the British Army trials of several light machine guns which began in 1932, the Vickers–Berthier was in direct competition with the ZB vz. 26. The British Army adopted the latter, modified and known as the Bren light machine gun, and the Vickers–Berthier was adopted by the British Indian Army. A production line for the Vickers–Berthier Light Machine-Gun Mk 3 was established at the Rifle Factory Ishapore.

Appearance and Design
The Vickers–Berthier Light Machine Gun has a 30-round box magazine and a bipod stand, and is sometimes mistaken for the Bren as both used a similar curved magazine to accommodate the rimmed .303 British cartridge.

It was also slightly longer, and harder to stow away. The Vickers–Berthier also had a slower cyclic rate of 500 rpm. The only major advantage the weapon had over the Bren was the far simpler design; it could be produced more efficiently.

It existed in five versions : Mk I, Mk II, Mk II light, Mk III and Mk IIIB. Mark 1 was introduced in 1928, Mark 2 in 1931 and Mark 3 in 1933.

Use
Apart from India, it was only sold to Latvia and Bolivia, but the design was modified into the Vickers K machine gun, called the Vickers Gas Operated (VGO).

In Indian service, it was replaced from 1942 by Brens but continued to serve with reserve units of the Indian Army into the 1980s.

Users 
 
 
 
 : Vickers–Berthier Mk I, more than 800 by April 1936
 : Captured from Bolivia
 : small numbers bought, known as m/931
  Kingdom of Spain: small numbers bought
 : 322 sold by Paraguay in 1936
 : limited use
 : Used by Taliban

Failed bids 
 : Vickers–Berthier gun was tested in 1927-1928, without success
 : Tested by Greek Army in 1925, which chose Hotchkiss machine gun instead

References

Bibliography

External links
"Rifle-Machine Gun Increases Efficiency of Infantry" Popular Mechanics, December 1930 early article with photos of first Vickers–Berthier

Light machine guns
World War II machine guns
World War II infantry weapons
Machine guns of India
Vickers
World War II infantry weapons of the United Kingdom
Machine guns of the United Kingdom
Military equipment introduced in the 1930s